Castro station is a Muni Metro station at the intersection of Market Street, Castro Street, and 17th Street in the Castro District of San Francisco, California. The underground station is served by the K Ingleside, M Ocean View, and S Shuttle lines. The F Market line serves the station on the street level at 17th and Castro.

Station layout and history 

The station consists of two side platforms next to the tracks on the second level down with the concourse mezzanine level overlooking it. Uniquely among Muni Metro stations, the platforms are slightly curved due to the transition from the Market Street subway to the Twin Peaks Tunnel between this station and the now-disused Eureka Valley station, just southwest. (All other stations on the Market Street subway have entrances spread out along the length of the station.) The southern entrance is located in Harvey Milk Plaza on the southwest corner of Market and Castro, and the northern entrance and street elevator on the northwest corner of Market and 17th.

The station was designed by Howard Grant AIA of Reid & Tarics Associates and was completed in 1976.  Service at the station began on June 11, 1980. Castro station features a transit plaza at the corner of Castro Street and Market Street.  In 1985 it was dedicated to Harvey Milk, the slain SF supervisor and first openly gay elected official in California.

In May 2016, the escalator in Harvey Milk Plaza was retrofitted with colored lights (to resemble the rainbow flag that flies above the plaza) after being rehabilitated. This test was considered a success; lights were added to 17 other escalators in the system, including the other three escalators at Castro, in 2018–19.

Muni plans to construct accessibility improvements, including a second elevator, in Harvey Milk Plaza at the south entrance of the station. A 2020 determination that the plaza is eligible for inclusion on the California Register of Historical Resources is not expected to impact elevator construction, but may stall the larger plaza project. , the elevator project is estimated to be complete in 2025.

In 2022, a new decorative railing was added on the F Market & Wharves boarding island as part of the Upper Market Street Safety Project. It features a quote from Harvey Milk's 1977 "You've Got to Have Hope" speech, as well as an illustration of streetcar #1051, which is dedicated in Milk's honor.

References

External links 

Muni Metro stations
Castro District, San Francisco
Market Street (San Francisco)
Railway stations located underground in California
Railway stations in the United States opened in 1980